Moronanita is a genus of moths of the family Tortricidae. It contains only one species, Moronanita moruna, which is found in Ecuador (Morona-Santiago).

The wingspan is 12.5 mm. The ground colour of the forewings is cream grey, suffused and dotted with brown-grey. The hindwings are dirty cream, strigulated with brown-grey.

Etymology
The generic name is based on the name of the Ecuadoran province Morona-Santiago. The species name refers to the name of Morona-Santiago province.

See also
List of Tortricidae genera

References

External links
tortricidae.com

Euliini
Tortricidae genera